Located in the Indian state of Tamil Nadu, Vinayagapuram is a northern region of Chennai city's Chennai district.

Location and surroundings

Vinayagapuram is a suburban residential area near Puzhal, Tamil Nadu. It is located just 1 km away from Retteri junction in Kolathur, Chennai. The area's main commuting route is a ring road near Lucas TVS junction, which connects the suburb to Padi, New Avadi road, Ayanavaram High Road, Anna Nagar, and Puzhal. Vinayagapuram was attached to the Chennai Corporation in 2011, aiding in its development. The neighbourhoods of Vinayagapuram consist of Anna Nagar, Villivakkam, Puzhal, Retteri junction, Kolathur, Jawahar Nagar, Lakshmipuram, TVK Nagar, Senthil Nagar, Perambur,  Puthagaram, Madhavaram, Surapet, and Periyar Nagar. It is close to the Grand North Trunk (GNT) road, which connects to Grand South trunk (GST) road.

Amenities
Vinayagapuram has several hospitals.

Transportation

The Metropolitan Transport Corporation (MTC) operates passenger buses to Vinayagapuram from other major parts of the city. The government has allotted a place for a bus terminal near the Vinayagapuram bus stand. The bus routes operated are 142 to Perambur and 29 ext to Mandaveli. These small buses ply between Vinayagapuram to Villivakkam. Share autorickshaws play an important role in transportation, as there is no railway line passing through Vinayagapuram.

Educational institutions
:
Velammal Engineering College (Surapet)
Kings School 
Infant Jesus School
Everwin School
Velammal School  (Surapet)
Veera Savarkar School
Godson School
Soka Ikeda Arts & Science College
Municipal higher secondary school (Lakshmi puram)

See also
Chennai Airport
Chennai Central
Chennai Suburban Railway
Chennai district

References

External links
 Chennai Online website

 Cities and towns in Tiruvallur district